The University of St Andrews Canoe Club, abbreviated to StAUCC, is a sports club at the University of St Andrews. The club's primary focus is recreational whitewater kayaking, but it also engages in other aspects of paddlesport, including surf kayaking, sea kayaking and canoeing. Additionally, members of StAUCC take part in various competitive kayaking disciplines, such as whitewater slalom, canoe polo and wildwater racing.

StAUCC is affiliated to the University of St Andrews Athletic Union and to the Scottish Canoe Association. The club was founded for the academic year of 1974–1975. The earliest known captain of the club was Gordon Harwell in 1981.

The club is based in St Andrews mainly operating out of their boat shed near East Sands.

Governance 
, the club is governed by a committee of 14 positions. The club captain leads the club but their role is more administrative than the name suggests, with the vice/competition's captain being responsible for leading competitive endeavours.

Competition 
The club competes nationally at British Universities and Colleges Sport (BUCS) events, including canoe polo, wildwater racing and canoe slalom.

BUCS Wild Water Racing results

BUCS Canoe Slalom results 

The club also competes within Scotland at the Scottish Student Sport (SSS) Canoe polo tournament in Glasgow and at the canoe polo Scottish division tournaments which are organised by the Scottish Canoe Association.

Appearance in media 
In 2007, the club was featured on BBC's Coast as part of a segment on student life at the University of St Andrews.

The club undertakes charitable and outreach work. They have worked with Sense Scotland in the past to help people with various disabilities enjoy canoeing and kayaking, one of these was reported on in the Perthshire Advertiser

The club is also regularly featured in the university's student media.

Notable Members

Jonathan Hawkins 
Jonny Hawkins was a member with the club from 2008 to 2012, and was the club captain in 2009, (his second year at the university). Jonny was selected for the 2011 British Universities Kayaking Expedition (BUKE). After this he went on to sea kayak around Scotland and Hong Kong. In the summer of 2013 Jonny was part of an expedition to Borneo, with the aims of exploring never before paddled whitewater and also of performing research for a conservation charity Heart of Borneo.

References

External links 
 
 Official blog

Canoe clubs in the United Kingdom
Sports organisations of Scotland
Canoeing in Scotland